The Annunciation, also known as Murate Annunciation, is a painting by the Italian Renaissance painter Filippo Lippi, finished around 1443–1450. It is housed in the Alte Pinakothek, Munich, Germany.

It depicts the Virgin humbly accepting her role as mother of Jesus, with a hand on her breast, while the dove, symbol of the Holy Spirit, is given to her. The angel is kneeling next to her, also with a hand on his breast a greeting sign. The scene is framed into a portico opening to a close garden.

See also
Lippi's Annunciation (Galleria Nazionale d'Arte Antica)
Lippi's Annunciation (Galleria Doria Pamphilj)

Paintings by Filippo Lippi
Collection of the Alte Pinakothek
Lippi Munich
1440s paintings